Committee for State Security of the Latvian Soviet Socialist Republic (() or KGB of LSSR was the secret police and state security organization of the Latvian Soviet Socialist Republic. It was controlled by the Soviet KGB and was established on April 10, 1954 and dissolved on August 24, 1991.

The chairmen of the KGB of LSSR were:
 Jānis Vēvers (April 10, 1954 - January 30, 1963);
 Longīns Avdjukēvičs (January 30, 1963 - November 21, 1981);
 Boriss Pugo (November 21, 1981 - May 24, 1984);
 Staņislavs Zukulis (May 24, 1984 - March 15, 1990)
 Edmunds Johansons (March 15, 1990 - August 24, 1991).

References 

Latvian Soviet Socialist Republic
KGB